Heighington is a surname. Notable people with the surname include:

Chris Heighington (born 1983), Australian-born English rugby league player
Musgrave Heighington (c. 1680 – 1764), English organist and composer
Wilfrid Heighington (1897–1945), Canadian soldier, writer, lawyer and politician